Lisa Middleton (born 1952) is an American politician, a member of the Palm Springs city council and the Former is Mayor of Palm Springs. She was first elected to the City Council in 2017 and is the first openly transgender person to be elected in California for a non-judicial position. She also serves on the Riverside County Transportation Commission, the Sunline Board of Directors as Vice Chair, alternate to the Metrolink Board of Directors.   She was appointed in April 2019 by Governor Gavin Newsom to the California Public Employees Retirement System (CalPERS) Board of Administration.  She is a member of the League of California Cities (Cal Cities) Board of Directors and the President (September 2021 – 2022) of the Cal Cities Riverside County Division. Middleton succeeded Christy Holstege as mayor of Palm Springs on December 9, 2021 and became the first openly transgender mayor in California. Middleton was succeeded by Mayor Grace Elena Garner on December, 15 2022. Middleton also served as Mayor Pro Tem of Palm Springs from December 10, 2020 to December 9, 2021.

Education 
Middleton has a Master of Public Administration from University of Southern California. She has also completed the UCLA LGBT Leadership Institute.

Work 
Middleton worked for 36 years with the State Compensation Insurance Fund of the State of California. When she retired she was the senior vice president of internal affairs with executive responsibility for internal audit, fraud investigation, public records and governance. She was also a member of California's Fraud Assessment Commission, which she chaired in 2010.

Awards 
She was included in the 2016 Pride Honors Awards recipients from Palm Springs Pride with the Spirit of Stonewall Community Service Award.

Personal life 
After 13 years together, Lisa and her wife Cheryl, a retired nurse, were married in July 2013. They have two children, a son and a daughter. Middleton is transgender and transitioned in the mid-1990s.

References 

1953 births
Living people
Transgender politicians
Transgender women
California city council members
Women city councillors in California
LGBT people from California
University of Southern California alumni
People from Palm Springs, California
Mayors of Palm Springs, California